The Shire of Daylesford and Glenlyon was a local government area about  northwest of Melbourne, the state capital of Victoria, Australia.

History

What became the Shire of Daylesford and Glenlyon had its origins in several different local authorities:

 The Shire of Glenlyon was incorporated on 24 February 1860 as the Glenlyon Road District, and was redesignated as Glenlyon Shire on 12 December 1865;
 The Shire of Mount Franklin was incorporated on 11 May 1860 as the Yandoit & Franklin Road District, and was redesignated as Mt Franklin Shire on 27 January 1871. After the passage of the Local Government Amendment Act 1914, it was found that Mount Franklin did not meet the criteria for a shire, as its rateable income was below £1,500 per annum, so it was absorbed by Glenlyon Shire on 1 October 1915.

On 3 May 1966, an Order in Council united the Borough of Daylesford with the Shire of Glenlyon, to create the new Shire of Daylesford and Glenlyon.

On 20 January 1995, the Shire of Daylesford and Glenlyon was abolished, and along with the Shire of Creswick and parts of the Shires of Kyneton and Talbot and Clunes, was merged into the newly created Shire of Hepburn.

Wards

The Shire of Daylesford and Glenlyon was divided into four ridings on 31 May 1966, each of which elected three councillors:
 Daylesford Riding
 Glenlyon Riding
 Hepburn Riding
 Mount Franklin Riding

Towns and localities

* Council seat.

Population

* Estimate in 1958 Victorian Year Book.

Gallery

References

External links
 Victorian Places - Daylesford and Glenlyon Shire

Daylesford and Glenlyon